Scottie dog sign is a radiological sign which refers to the appearance of lumbar spine in oblique view X-ray. In the X-ray, the spine can be visualised as the lateral view of a Scottie dog, with the pedicle as the eye, the transverse process as the nose, the superior articular facet as the ear and the inferior articular facet as the front leg, spinous process as the body. It was once used as a diagnostic sign for lumbar spondylolysis, but it is not commonly in use nowadays because of the advent of more sensitive diagnostic methods such as the CT scan and MRI scan.

References

Radiologic signs